The 1946 Railway Cup Hurling Championship was the 20th series of the inter-provincial hurling Railway Cup. Four matches were played between 11 February and 17 March 1945. It was contested by Connacht, Leinster, Munster and Ulster.

Munster entered the championship as the defending champions.

On 17 March 1946, Munster won the Railway Cup after a 3-12 to 4-08 defeat of Connacht in the final at Croke Park, Dublin. This was their 14th title over all and their fifth title in succession.

Connacht's Josie Gallagher was the Railway Cup top scorer with 1-12.

Results

Semi-finals

Final

Sources
 Donegan, Des, The Complete Handbook of Gaelic Games (DBA Publications Limited, 2005).

External links
 Munster Railway Cup-winning teams

Railway Cup Hurling Championship
Railway Cup Hurling Championship